Anne Zouroudi (born Lincolnshire) is a British novelist, and author of the Greek Detective series.  Her protagonist is Hermes Diaktoros, also known simply as "the fat man". Anne Zouroudi was shortlisted for the ITV3 Crime Thriller Award 2008 for Breakthrough Authors, and The Messenger of Athens was longlisted for the Desmond Elliott Prize 2008 for first novels with word of mouth appeal.

Biography
Anne was born in rural Lincolnshire but raised in South Yorkshire. After working in IT in the UK and US, Anne met and married a Greek man and settled in Greece. She now lives in Greece on the island of Rhodes.

Bibliography 
 The Messenger of Athens (2007)
 The Taint of Midas (2008)
 The Doctor of Thessaly (2009)
 The Lady of Sorrows (2010)
 The Whispers of Nemesis (2011)
 The Bull of Mithros (2012)
 The Feast of Artemis (2013)
 The Gifts of Poseidon (2016)

References

External links 
 Author's website
 Review of The Taint of Midas in The Independent
 Anne Zouroudi in photographs

English crime fiction writers
Living people
English women novelists
Women crime fiction writers
21st-century English novelists
Writers from Lincolnshire
Writers from Yorkshire
21st-century English women writers
Year of birth missing (living people)